Banking on Heaven is a documentary film which exposes the largest polygamous enclave in the United States (located in Colorado City, Arizona) and its leader, Warren Jeffs. Banking on Heaven was directed by Dot Reidelbach and written, produced, and narrated by Laurie Allen, who escaped a similar polygamous sect at age sixteen (her uncle was Ervil LeBaron).

Banking on Heaven focuses on the Fundamentalist Church of Jesus Christ of Latter Day Saints (FLDS Church), a schismatic  polygamous sect of the Latter Day Saint movement that (at the time of the creation of the film) existed in Colorado City, Arizona. The documentary holds interviews with many escapees as well as those that have been excommunicated from the church. The documentary also interviews law enforcement as well as Utah and Arizona State politicians and poses questions on what can be done to rescue or help the women of the FLDS.

References

External links
Official site
review from Brigham Young University
 
 

2005 films
American documentary films
Documentary films critical of the Fundamentalist Church of Jesus Christ of Latter-Day Saints
2005 documentary films
Mormonism and polygamy
Polygamy in the United States
2000s English-language films
2000s American films